Thelonious is a given name. Notable people with the name include:
 Fred Thelonious Baker (born 1960) English guitarist
 Thelonious Bernard (born 1964) French actor
 Thelonious Martin (born 1992) or King Thelonious, American Hip Hop record producer
 Thelonious Monk (1917–82), American jazz pianist
 Thelonious Sphere Monk III (born 1949), known as T. S. Monk, son of Thelonious Monk

Characters
  Thelonious (Shrek), one of Lord Farquaad's henchmen in the film Shrek
 Thelonious Jagger 'TJ' Kippen, a character in the American television show Andi Mack
 Thelonious Jaha, a character in the American television show The 100

See also
 Thelonious Monster, an American post-punk rock band
 Thelonious Sphere Monk (disambiguation)